Jang Tae-sung (born September 27, 1980) is a South Korean actor. He has mostly played supporting roles.

Filmography

Film

Television series

References

External links 
 
 
 

1980 births
Living people
21st-century South Korean male actors
South Korean male film actors
South Korean male television actors
Male actors from Busan
Dongguk University alumni